Tammela may refer to:

 Tammela, Estonia, a village in Hiiumaa Parish, Hiiu County, Estonia
 Tammela, Finland,  a municipality in the province of Southern Finland
 Tammela, Tampere, a city district in Tampere, Finland
 Tammela Square, a market square in Tampere, Finland
 Tammela Stadion, a football stadium in Tampere, Finland